Broadway, Durban is a residential area in northern Durban, KwaZulu-Natal, South Africa.

References

Suburbs of Durban